Heyat Football Chaharmahal and Bakhtiari Football Club is an Iranian football club based in Shahrekord, Iran. They took the place of Shahrdari Shahrekord in the middle of the 2009–10 2nd Division season.

Season-by-Season

The table below shows the achievements of the club in various competitions.

See also
 Hazfi Cup
 Iran Football's 2nd Division
 Iran Football's 3rd Division

Football clubs in Iran
Association football clubs established in 2000
2000 establishments in Iran